Parliamentary elections were held in Sierra Leone on 1 May 1982. They were the first elections since the country had become a one-party state under the 1978 constitution, with the All People's Congress being the sole legal party.

Background
Following an amendment to the constitution in 1981, prior to the election, primaries were held to choose up to three candidates (all selected by the APC) to stand in each of the 85 constituencies. As a result, elections in 66 of the 85 constituencies were contested (13 of the 19 seats left uncontested were held by cabinet ministers).

The elections were marred by violence in which up to 50 people died. The APC used the army to crush opposition SLPP supporters in what became known as the "Ndogboyosoi [bush devil] war".

In addition to the 85 elected seats, the parliament consisted of 12 paramount chiefs elected through tribal councils and 7 MPs appointed by the president, Siaka Stevens.

Results

Aftermath
The results in 13 constituencies were cancelled due to "serious irregularities". By-elections took place on June 4.

40 sitting MPs and two ministers lost their seats, whilst a woman was elected to parliament in a constituency seat for the first time.

References

Elections in Sierra Leone
One-party elections
Sierra Leone
1982 in Sierra Leone
Election and referendum articles with incomplete results
May 1982 events in Africa